The 1964–1985 military dictatorship in Brazil engaged in censorship of media, artists, journalists, and others it deemed "subversive," "dangerous," or "immoral" . The political system installed by the 1964 coup d'état also set out to censor material that went against what it called  ('morality and good manners').

The government prohibited the production as well as the circulation of such material. In addition to foreign books and authors, especially those social and political in nature, about 140 books by Brazilian authors were forbidden by the state in that period, fiction as well as non-fiction. Among these Brazilian authors there were Érico Veríssimo, Jorge Amado, Darcy Ribeiro, Rubem Fonseca, Caio Prado Júnior, Celso Furtado, Ignácio de Loyola Brandão, Dalton Trevisan, Maria da Conceição Tavares, Olympio Mourão Filho, and others.

History 
At the beginning of the military dictatorship, between the coup in 1964 and Institutional Act Number Five in 1968, censorship involved confiscation initiatives with physical coercion by poorly trained agents at random checkpoints.

Throughout the dictatorship, the hierarchical structure of organs involved in censorship went through transformations. The  was originally established December 26, 1945 under Getúlio Vargas.

The  made censorship an official, centralized activity of the federal government in Brasília.

Two protests against the military dictatorship precipitated the AI-5: the  protest against the prohibition of 8 plays February 1968 and the March of the One Hundred Thousand in June of that year.

On December 13, 1968, the Institutional Act Number Five was announced in the name of "authentic democratic order [...] (and) the combat of subversion and of the ideologies contrary to the traditions of our people," creating conditions under which disclosure of information, manifesting opinions, and cultural and artistic production were subjected to censorship.

The January 1977  'Petition of the Intellectuals' led by Lygia Fagundes Telles, with over a thousand signatures against the dictatorship, was delivered to the Ministry of Justice in Brasília and broke the momentum of the censors.

On October 13, 1978, Constitutional Amendment No. 11 revoked the AI-5, effective January 1, 1979. Zuenir Ventura estimates that in the decade in which the AI-5 was in effect, approximately 500 films, 450 theatrical plays, 200 books, dozens of radio programs, 100 magazines, over 500 song lyrics, and a dozen telenovela titles and pilots" were censored.

Notable cases 
Caetano Veloso and Gilberto Gil were arrested December 17, 1968—days after AI-5 was announced—under the false accusation of having performed a parody the Brazilian National Anthem to the tune of "Tropicália" at the Sucata club in Rio de Janeiro. They joined a number of Brazilian artists who lived in exile during the military dictatorship.

Resistance 
Some artists responded to the climate of censorship and repression by cleverly disguising subversive messages in their work. Notable examples include Geraldo Vandré's 1968 "" as well as Chico Buarque's 1970 "" and 1973 "."

Some newspapers adopted strategies—such as printing excerpts from Luís de Camões's 16th century Os Lusíadas or cake recipes calling for a kilogram of salt—to indicate to readers that the content in those sections had been censored. So much material was censored from O Estado de S. Paulo between December 1969 and January 1975 that it printed all 8,116 verses of the Lusíadas twice over.

References 

Censorship in Brazil
Military dictatorship in Brazil